Jawaharnagar may refer to:

 Jawaharnagar, Ranga Reddy, in India
 Jawaharnagar (Gujarat Refinery)